This is a list of high schools in the state of Kentucky.

If a school's mailing address differs from its physical location, the postal location is in parentheses.

Also, if necessary, the schools are split into public and private, and also by district. Note that Kentucky has two types of public school districts: county districts, styled "XXXX County (Public) Schools" or in some cases "XXXX County School District"; and independent districts, which have varying styles with the common element of not including the word "County".  Unless specified, public schools are affiliated with their associated county district.

Adair County
Adair County High School, Columbia

Allen County

Scottsville
Allen County Scottsville High School (Allen County Schools)
East End Christian Academy (Private)

Anderson County

Lawrenceburg
Anderson County High School (Anderson County Schools)
 Christian Academy of Lawrenceburg (Private)

Ballard County
Ballard Memorial High School, Barlow

Barren County

Glasgow
Barren County High School (Barren County Schools)
Glasgow High School (Glasgow Independent Schools)
 Glasgow Christian Academy (Private)

Note: The Caverna Independent Schools district includes a portion of northwest Barren County, as well as a part of southern Hart County. The district's headquarters and its elementary school are in Cave City, in Barren County, while its middle and high school is located in Horse Cave, in Hart County.

Bath County
Bath County High School, Owingsville

Bell County
Middlesboro High School, Middlesboro (Middlesboro Independent Schools)
Red Bird Christian School, Beverly (Private)

Pineville
Bell County High School (Bell County Schools)
Pineville High School (Pineville Independent Schools)

Boone County
Conner High School, Hebron (Boone County Schools)
St. Henry District High School, Erlanger (Private)
Walton-Verona High School, Walton (Walton-Verona Independent Schools)

Florence
Boone County High School (Boone County Schools)
Heritage Academy Christian School (Private)

Union
Larry A. Ryle High School (Boone County Schools)
Randall K. Cooper High School (Boone County Schools)

Bourbon County

Paris
Bourbon County High School (Bourbon County Schools)
Paris High School (Paris Independent Schools)
Bourbon Christian Academy (Private)

Boyd County
Fairview High School, Westwood (Fairview Independent Schools)
Ramey-Estep High School, Rush (Boyd County Public Schools)

Ashland
Paul G. Blazer High School (Ashland Independent School District)
Boyd County High School (Boyd County Public Schools)
Rose Hill Christian School (Private)

Boyle County

Danville

Boyle County High School (Boyle County School District)
Danville Christian Academy (Private)
Danville High School (Danville Schools)
Kentucky School for the Deaf (State-operated)

Bracken County
Augusta High School, Augusta (Augusta Independent Schools)
Bracken County High School, Brooksville (Bracken County Schools)

Breathitt County
Riverside Christian School, Lost Creek (Private)

Jackson

Breathitt County High School (Breathitt County Schools)
Jackson City School (Jackson Independent Schools)
Mt. Carmel School (Private)
Oakdale Christian Academy (Private)

Breckinridge County
Breckinridge County High School, Harned (Breckinridge County Schools)
Frederick Fraize High School, Cloverport (Cloverport Independent Schools)

Bullitt County
Bullitt Central High School, Shepherdsville
Bullitt East High School, Mount Washington
North Bullitt High School, Hebron Estates

Butler County
Butler County High School, Morgantown

Caldwell County
Caldwell County High School, Princeton

Calloway County

Murray
Calloway County High School (Calloway County Schools)
Murray High School (Murray Independent Schools)

Campbell County

Bellevue High School, Bellevue (Bellevue Independent Schools)
Dayton High School, Dayton (Dayton Independent Schools)
Highlands High School, Fort Thomas (Fort Thomas Independent Schools)
Silver Grove High School, Silver Grove (Silver Grove Independent Schools]]

Alexandria
Bishop Brossart High School (Private)
Campbell County High School (Campbell County Schools)

Newport
Newport High School (Newport Independent Schools)
Newport Central Catholic High School (Private)

Carlisle County
Carlisle County High School, Bardwell

Carroll County

Carrollton
Carroll County High School (Carroll County Public Schools)
Christian Academy of Carrollton (Private)

Carter County
East Carter High School, Grayson
West Carter High School, Olive Hill

Casey County
Casey County High School, Liberty

Christian County

Hopkinsville

Christian County High School (Christian County Public Schools)
Gateway Academy to Innovation & Technology (Christian County Public Schools)
Heritage Christian Academy (Private)
Hopkinsville High School (Christian County Public Schools)
University Heights Academy (Private)

Clark County
George Rogers Clark High School, Winchester

Clay County
Clay County High School, Manchester (Clay County Schools)
Oneida Baptist Institute, Oneida (Private)

Clinton County
Clinton County High School, Albany

Crittenden County
Crittenden County High School, Marion

Cumberland County
Cumberland County High School, Burkesville

Daviess County
Trinity High School, Whitesville (Private)

Owensboro

Apollo High School (Daviess County Schools)
Daviess County High School (Daviess County Schools)
Owensboro Catholic High School (Private)
Owensboro High School (Owensboro Public Schools)

Edmonson County
Edmonson County High School, Brownsville

Elliott County
Elliott County High School, Sandy Hook

Estill County
Estill County High School, Irvine

Fayette County

Lexington

Fayette County Public Schools

Bryan Station High School
Eastside Technical Center
Frederick Douglass High School
Henry Clay High School
Lafayette High School
Paul Laurence Dunbar High School
Tates Creek High School

Private

Clays Mill Road Christian Academy
Lexington Catholic High School
Lexington Christian Academy
Lexington Latin School
Mars Hill Academy
Sayre School
Trinity Christian Academy

Fleming County
Fleming County High School, Flemingsburg

Floyd County

Betsy Layne High School, Betsy Layne (Floyd County Schools)
The David School, David (Private)
Floyd Central High School, Eastern (Floyd County Schools)
The Piarist School, Martin (Private)
Prestonsburg High School, Prestonsburg (Floyd County Schools)

Franklin County

Frankfort

Frankfort High School (Frankfort Independent Schools)
Frankfort Christian Academy
Franklin County High School (Franklin County Public Schools)
Western Hills High School (Franklin County Public Schools)
William Cofield High School (Franklin County Public Schools)

Fulton County
Fulton County High School, Hickman (Fulton County Schools)
Fulton High School, Fulton (Fulton Independent Schools)

Gallatin County
Gallatin County High School, Warsaw

Garrard County
Garrard County High School, Lancaster

Grant County
Grant County High School, Dry Ridge (Grant County Schools)
Williamstown High School, Williamstown (Williamstown Independent Schools)

Graves County

Mayfield
Graves County High School (Graves County Schools)
Mayfield High School (Mayfield Independent Schools)

Grayson County

Leitchfield
Bethel Christian Academy (Private)
Grayson County High School (Grayson County Schools)

Green County
Green County High School, Greensburg

Greenup County
Greenup County High School, Lloyd (Greenup County Schools)
Raceland-Worthington High School, Raceland (Raceland-Worthington Independent Schools)
Russell High School, Flatwoods (Russell Independent Schools)

Hancock County
Hancock County High School, Lewisport

Hardin County
Fort Knox High School, Fort Knox (DoDEA America)

Elizabethtown
Central Hardin High School (Hardin County Schools)
Elizabethtown Christian Academy (Private)
Elizabethtown High School (Elizabethtown Independent Schools)

Radcliff
John Hardin High School (Hardin County Schools)
North Hardin Christian Academy (Private)
North Hardin High School (Hardin County Schools

Harlan County
Harlan High School, Harlan (Harlan Independent Schools)
Harlan County High School, Rosspoint (Harlan County Public Schools)

Harrison County
Harrison County High School, Cynthiana

Hart County
Caverna High School, Horse Cave (Caverna Independent Schools)
Hart County High School, Munfordville (Hart County Schools)

Henderson County
Henderson County High School, Henderson

Henry County
Eminence High School, Eminence (Eminence Independent Schools)
Henry County High School, New Castle (Henry County Schools)

Hickman County
Hickman County High School, Clinton

Hopkins County
Dawson Springs Jr/Sr High School, Dawson Springs (Dawson Springs Independent Schools)

Madisonville/Hopkins County Schools
Hopkins County Central High School
Madisonville North Hopkins High School

Jackson County
Jackson County High School, McKee

Jefferson County
Eastern High School, Middletown
Jeffersontown High School, Jeffersontown

Louisville

Jefferson County Public Schools

Atherton High School
Ballard High School
Breckinridge Metro High School
Butler Traditional High School
Central High School
Doss High School
DuPont Manual High School
Fairdale High School
Fern Creek Traditional High School
Iroquois High School
J. Graham Brown School
Liberty High School
Louisville Male High School
Marion C. Moore High School
Pleasure Ridge Park High School
Seneca High School MCA
The Academy @ Shawnee
Southern High School
Valley Traditional High School
Waggener Traditional High School
Youth Performing Arts School
Western High School

Private

Assumption High School
Beth Haven Christian School
Christian Academy of Louisville
Christian Educational Consortium
DeSales High School
Evangel Christian School
Highlands Latin School
Holy Angels Academy
Holy Cross High School
Kentucky Country Day School
Landmark Christian Academy
Louisville Collegiate School
Mercy Academy
MICAH Christian School
Nur Islamic School of Louisville
Portland Christian School
Presentation Academy
Sacred Heart Academy
Sayers Classical Academy
St. Francis High School
St. Xavier High School
Trinity High School, Louisville
Valiant Christian Academy
Walden School
Whitefield Academy

State-operated
Kentucky School for the Blind

Jessamine County

Nicholasville
East Jessamine High School
West Jessamine High School

Johnson County

Paintsville
Johnson Central High School (Johnson County School District)
Paintsville High School (Paintsville Independent School District)

Kenton County

Beechwood High School, Fort Mitchell (Beechwood Independent School District)
Dixie Heights High School, Edgewood (Kenton County School District)
Lloyd Memorial High School, Erlanger (Erlanger-Elsmere Schools)
Ludlow High School, Ludlow (Ludlow Independent Schools)
Scott High School, Taylor Mill (Kenton County School District)
Villa Madonna Academy, Villa Hills (Private)

Covington

Calvary Christian School (Private)
Covington Latin School (Private)
Holmes Junior/Senior High School (Covington Independent Public Schools)
Holy Cross High School (Private)

Independence
Community Christian Academy (Private)
Simon Kenton High School (Kenton County School District)

Park Hills
Covington Catholic High School (Private)
Notre Dame Academy (Private)

Knott County
Knott County Central High School, Hindman (Knott County Schools)
June Buchanan School, Pippa Passes (Private)

Knox County
Lynn Camp Middle/High School, Corbin

Barbourville
Barbourville High School (Barbourville Independent School District)
Knox Central High School (Knox County Public Schools)

LaRue County
LaRue County High School, Hodgenville

Laurel County

London
North Laurel High School
South Laurel High School

Lawrence County
Lawrence County High School, Louisa

Lee County
Lee County High School, Beattyville

Leslie County
Leslie County High School, Hyden

Letcher County
Jenkins Middle/High School, Jenkins (Jenkins Independent Schools)
Letcher County Central High School, Ermine (Letcher County Schools)

Lewis County
Lewis County High School, Vanceburg

Lincoln County
Lincoln County High School, Stanford

Livingston County
Livingston Central High School, Smithland

Logan County

Russellville
Logan County High School (Logan County Schools)
Russellville High School (Russellville Independent Schools)

Lyon County
Lyon County High School, Eddyville

Madison County

Berea
Berea Independent Schools:
Berea Community High School (Berea Independent Schools)
Madison Southern High School (Madison County Schools)

Richmond
Madison Central High School (Madison County Schools)
Model Laboratory School (Operated by Eastern Kentucky University)

Magoffin County
Magoffin County High School, Salyersville

Marion County
Marion County High School (Kentucky), Lebanon

Marshall County
Christian Fellowship School, Benton (Private)
Marshall County High School, Draffenville (Marshall County Schools)

Martin County
Martin County High School, Inez

Mason County

Maysville
Mason County High School (Mason County Schools)
St. Patrick's High School (Private)

McCracken County

Paducah

Community Christian Academy (Private)
McCracken County High School (McCracken County Public Schools)
Paducah Tilghman High School (Paducah Public Schools)
St. Mary High School (Private)

McCreary County
McCreary Central High School, Stearns

McLean County
McLean County High School, Calhoun

Meade County
Meade County High School, Brandenburg

Menifee County
Menifee County High School, Frenchburg

Mercer County
Mercer County Senior High School, Harrodsburg

Metcalfe County
Metcalfe County High School, Edmonton

Monroe County
Monroe County High School, Tompkinsville

Montgomery County
Montgomery County High School, Mount Sterling

Morgan County
Morgan County High School, West Liberty

Muhlenberg County
Muhlenberg County High School, Greenville

Nelson County

Bardstown

Bardstown High School (Bardstown City Schools)
Bethlehem High School (Private)
Bluegrass Christian Academy (Private)
Horizons Academy (Nelson County Schools)
Nelson County Baptist School (Private)
Nelson County High School (Nelson County Schools)
Thomas Nelson High School (Nelson County Schools)

Nicholas County
Nicholas County High School, Carlisle

Ohio County
Ohio County High School, Hartford

Oldham County
North Oldham High School, Goshen
South Oldham High School, Crestwood

Buckner
Buckner Alternative High School
Oldham County High School

Owen County
Owen County High School, Owenton

Owsley County
Owsley County High School, Booneville

Pendleton County
Pendleton County High School, Falmouth

Perry County
Buckhorn High School, Buckhorn (Perry County Schools)

Hazard
Hazard High School (Hazard Independent Schools)
Perry County Central High School (Perry County Schools)

Pike County
Belfry High School, Belfry (Pike County Schools)
East Ridge High School, Lick Creek (Pike County Schools)
Phelps High School, Phelps (Pike County Schools)

Pikeville
Pike County Central High School (Pike County Schools)
Pikeville High School (Pikeville Independent Schools)
Shelby Valley High School (Pike County Schools)

Powell County
Powell County High School, Stanton

Pulaski County

Somerset

Pulaski County High School (Pulaski County Schools)
Somerset Christian School (Private)
Somerset High School (Somerset Independent Schools)
Southwestern High School (Pulaski County Schools)

Robertson County
Robertson County High School, Mount Olivet

Rockcastle County
Rockcastle County High School, Mount Vernon

Rowan County
Lakeside Christian Academy, Clearfield

Morehead
Farmers Christian Academy (Private)
Rowan County Senior High School (Rowan County Schools)

Russell County
Russell County High School, Russell Springs

Scott County
Great Crossing High School, Georgetown
Scott County High School, Georgetown

Shelby County

Shelbyville
Cornerstone Christian Academy
Martha Layne Collins High School (Shelby County Public Schools)
Shelby County High School (Shelby County Public Schools)

Simpson County
Franklin-Simpson High School, Franklin

Spencer County

Taylorsville/Spencer County Public Schools
Hillview Academy
Spencer County High School

Taylor County

Campbellsville
Campbellsville High School (Campbellsville Independent Schools)
Taylor County High School (Taylor County Schools)

Todd County
Todd County Central High School, Elkton

Trigg County
Trigg County High School, Cadiz

Trimble County
Trimble County High School, Bedford

Union County
Union County High School, Morganfield

Warren County

Bowling Green

Bowling Green High School (Bowling Green Independent Schools)
Greenwood High School (Warren County Public Schools)
Legacy Christian Academy of Bowling Green (Private)
Lighthouse Academy (Warren County Public Schools)
South Warren High School (Warren County Public Schools)
Warren Central High School (Warren County Public Schools)
Warren East High School (Warren County Public Schools)

Washington County
Washington County High School, Springfield

Wayne County
Wayne County High School, Monticello

Webster County
Webster County High School, Dixon

Whitley County
Corbin High School, Corbin (Corbin Independent School District)

Williamsburg
Whitley County High School (Whitley County Schools)
Williamsburg High School (Williamsburg Independent Schools)

Wolfe County
Wolfe County High School, Campton

Woodford County
Woodford County High School, Versailles

Notes
In addition to the above schools, one school located in Tennessee is a member of the Kentucky High School Athletic Association, the state's governing body for high school sports. Fort Campbell High School is located in the Tennessee portion of the Fort Campbell Army base, but has always competed against Kentucky schools. Most of the base housing is in Kentucky, and the high school was once located on the Kentucky side of the base. Like Fort Knox High School, it is administered by the Kentucky District of DoDEA America (the portion of the Department of Defense Education Activity that operates schools within the U.S.).

See also

List of middle schools in Kentucky
List of school districts in Kentucky

References

External links
List of high schools in Kentucky from SchoolTree.org

Kentucky
High